Juan Pablo Dotti (born  June 24, 1984) is an Argentine professional racing cyclist, who currently rides for UCI Continental team .

On October 21, 2011, he was suspended by the USADA for testing positive to doping.

Major results

2004
 2nd Time trial, National Under-23 Road Championships
2005
 1st  Time trial, National Under-23 Road Championships
2007
 1st Stage 3 Vuelta a Navarra
 Vuelta a Venezuela
1st Stages 1a & 11
 3rd Overall Vuelta a San Juan
1st Stage 9
2008
 1st Stage 9 Vuelta a San Juan
2009
 1st Stage 5 Vuelta del Uruguay
2012
 1st  Road race, National Road Championships
2018
 1st Stage 2 Vuelta del Uruguay
 2nd Overall Vuelta del Uruguay
2019 
 1st  Time trial, National Road Championships 
 4th Overall Vuelta Ciclista de Chile 
2020
 10th Overall Vuelta a San Juan
2021 
 1st  Time trial, National Road Championships
2022 
 2nd Time trial, National Road Championships
2023
 1st Stage 3 Vuelta del Porvenir San Luis

References

External links

1984 births
Living people
Argentine male cyclists
Cyclists from Buenos Aires